The Church of los Remedios (Spanish: Iglesia de los Remedios) is an old church located in Guadalajara, Spain. It was declared Bien de Interés Cultural in 1924. Now, it's the auditorium of the University of Alcalá in Guadalajara.

References 

Roman Catholic churches in Guadalajara, Spain
Bien de Interés Cultural landmarks in the Province of Guadalajara
Renaissance architecture in Castilla–La Mancha
Tourist attractions in Guadalajara (Spain)
Buildings and structures in Guadalajara, Spain